The University of Central Arkansas (Central Arkansas or UCA) is a public university in Conway, Arkansas. Founded in 1907 as the Arkansas State Normal School, the university is one of the oldest in the U.S. state of Arkansas. As the state's only normal school at the time, UCA has historically been the primary source of teachers in Arkansas.

The university comprises five colleges and five residential colleges and one commuter college. UCA has about 12,000 graduate and undergraduate students, making it one of the largest universities in the state. The university maintains a student-to-faculty ratio of approximately 17 to 1. Over 150 undergraduate, graduate, and professional programs are offered at the university. UCA occupies over 120 buildings within its .

History

The Arkansas State Legislature created the Arkansas State Normal School, now known as the University of Central Arkansas, in 1907 by passage of Act 317 on May 14. The purpose of The Arkansas State Normal School was to properly train students to become professional teachers and centralize teacher training. Two faculty members taught in two departments and President Doyne taught pedagogy and Latin.

In 1925, Arkansas State Normal School became Arkansas State Teachers College. The name change more accurately reflected the primary focus of instruction and mission of the institution.

By 1967, the mission of Arkansas State Teachers College had changed. Though teacher training was still an important part of the school's mission, other fields began to expand in liberal arts studies and in the emerging field of health care. To recognize the institution's existing academic diversity another name change was in order. In January 1967, Arkansas State Teachers College became the State College of Arkansas.

President Silas Snow, who championed the name change in 1967, organized State College of Arkansas along university lines in preparation for still yet another name change. State College of Arkansas grew rapidly and offered an ever-widening range of degree programs. By January 1975, Snow's efforts were realized as the State Department of Higher Education recommended State College of Arkansas be known as The University of Central Arkansas, or UCA.

Presidents

 John James Doyne (1908–1917)
 Burr Walter Torreyson (1917–1930)
 Heber L. McAlister (1930–1941)
 Nolen M. Irby (1941–1953)
 Silas D. Snow (1953–1975)
 Jefferson D. Farris (1975–1986)
 Winfred L. Thompson (1988–2001)
 Lu Hardin (2002–2008)
 Allen Meadors (2009–2011)
 Tom Courtway (2011–2016)
 Houston Davis (2017– )

2008 shooting

On Sunday, October 26, 2008, a shooting took place on the UCA campus shortly after 9:00pm CDT, outside of Arkansas Hall, a campus residence hall. Two students – Ryan Henderson, 18, and Chavares Block, 19 – were fatally shot. A third person, 19-year-old Martrevis Norman, a non-student visiting the campus, was shot in the leg and was treated at the nearby Conway Regional Medical Center.

UCA Police Department arrested four suspects in the shooting. All four subsequently pleaded guilty and were sentenced to the Arkansas Department of Correction.

Enrollment
As of fall 2016, UCA has an enrollment of 11,487 students. Enrollment for 2015 was 11,754 and 11,698 for 2014. Retention for full-time, first-time undergraduates increased from 72.4 percent from fall 2014 to 72.9 percent from fall 2015. Graduate student enrollment is 1,872, while last year the number was 1,867 and the number of transfer students increased to 775 compared to 618 last year.

Traditions

Colors
The colors for UCA were decided the first year and according to an article in the November 24, 1908, edition of the Log Cabin Democrat, were said to be purple and silver. President Doyne assigned the task of developing school colors to W.O. Wilson and Ida Waldran in 1908. Wilson was wearing a gray sweater and Waldran was wearing a purple scarf. They chose the colors based upon the color of the clothing they were wearing that day. Both Wilson and Waldran thought that purple and gray complemented each other. Today the official colors for all UCA sports teams are purple and gray.

Mascot
The UCA athletic teams first had a mascot in 1920. According to Dr. Ted Worley, author of A History of The Arkansas State Teachers College, the UCA teams from 1908 to 1919 were referred to by many names, including: Tutors, Teachers, Pedagogues, Pea-Pickers, and Normalites. In 1920, the Bears became the mascot for the teams. However, the teams were called the "Bears" in print until April 7, 1921. Dr. Worley also quoted sources as saying the Bear was an appropriate symbol for the school because Arkansas' nickname was the "Bear State". The women's teams were known as the Bearettes for several years. The name of Sugar Bear came later. Victor E. Bear came about in 1999 and Victoria E. Bear came soon after. Bruce D. Bear became the newest addition to the UCA family in 2006.

Main Hall
UCA's Main Hall is the oldest building on campus. This building was completed in 1919 and was built by George Donaghey, the man for whom Donaghey Avenue is named and a former governor of the State of Arkansas. After the building was built it served a dual role as the administration building and as a classroom building. It continued to serve as the administration building until the 1960s. On February 11, 2011, the building was named on the National Register of Historic Places.

World War II Marker
UCA's World War II Memorial was dedicated in October 2003. The memorial contains the names and branch of service of forty-six UCA alumni who were killed during World War II. The memorial is seen as a permanent reminder of those UCA alumni who lost their lives during the conflict.

Senior Legacy Walk Brick Campaign
The Senior Walk is located in the courtyard in front of the Student Center. Each year, graduates will have the opportunity to purchase bricks as part of their class year. For $100, graduates can purchase a brick that will be inscribed with his/her name or the name of a graduate that a purchaser wants to honor.

Academics

The university has six distinct colleges offering over 150 majors. These colleges are: The College of Business, the College of Education, the College of Fine Arts and Communications, the College of Health and Behavioral Sciences, the College of Liberal Arts, and the College of Natural Sciences and Mathematics.

In January 2010, UCA mass communication students launched The Fountain (now The Fountain Magazine), a daily source of news and information. The student-created website is named "The Fountain", after the historic landmark located on the university's campus. The Fountain merged with The Echo UCA's oldest student media outlet in January 2014 to combine print and online resources. The Fountain Magazine was created following the merger.

Colleges
The University of Central Arkansas in Conway, Arkansas, comprises six colleges. In addition to the programs offered at the colleges, it has a study abroad program. Students may, for example, study literature in Italy and UK, healthcare in China or Sociology in Africa. Credits earned at several foreign universities may be credited towards a degree at UCA. UCA is also recognized as distinct by the Arkansas Department of Higher Education for being one of the nation's 20 Asian Studies Development Program's Regional Centers for Asian Studies, a joint program of the federally funded East West Center and University of Hawaii at Manoa.

College of Fine Arts and Communication

The College of Fine Arts and Communication offers five fields of study for a degree. Many of the college's degrees enable graduates to work or teach in their chosen profession. The college offers both bachelor and graduate programs.

College of Natural Sciences and Mathematics

This college offers eleven fields of study in the natural sciences, engineering, and mathematics, as well as six pre-professional programs. The college includes UCA STEMteach, a UTeach replication program. The college offers both bachelor's and master's degrees.

College of Business

Business students attending the University of Central Arkansas can pursue an associate, bachelor's, or graduate degree through this college.

College of Health and Behavioral Sciences
This college offers bachelor and graduate degrees. ROTC students at the University of Central Arkansas attend this college for training as a commissioned officer.

College of Liberal Arts

There are multiple fields of study available within the College of Liberal Arts. The college offers graduate and bachelor's degrees.

College of Education
The university's College of Education trains future teachers and educators.

Drama and theatre arts
The University of Central Arkansas participates annually in the Kennedy Center American College Theatre Festival. UCA also holds the annual Arkansas High School Audition Day which is a chance for any High School senior interested in majoring in theater to audition before most of the theatre programs in the state of Arkansas. UCA Theatre is accredited by the National Association of Schools of Theatre.

Public Appearances
UCA Public Appearances is a division of the university's College of Fine Arts & Communication. Its primary responsibilities are to manage the Donald W. Reynolds Performance Hall—a 1,200-seat, state-of-the-art theater—and to develop and present performing arts programming in the hall.

The Reynolds Performance Hall opened on September 15, 2000, with a sold-out concert by the late Ray Charles. Since then, the theater has hosted numerous celebrities, including Loretta Lynn, Rhonda Vincent, Seth Meyers, Gavin DeGraw, the Temptations, Gladys Knight, Ronan Tynan, The Golden Dragon Acrobats, Frankie Valli & the Four Seasons, mezzo-soprano Denyce Graves, Dallas Cowboys owner Jerry Jones, local composer David William Allison, and many national and international touring companies.

A four-person full-time staff, two part-time staff, and numerous student workers are employed by Public Appearances.

UCA Public Appearances manages UCA Ticket Central, which provides ticketing services for all non-athletic ticketed events on the campus. UCA Ticket Central serves Public Appearances, UCA Theatre, the Conway Symphony Orchestra, the Arkansas Shakespeare Theatre, Student Activities events, and events sponsored by organizations within and outside the university.

UCA Public Appearances is supported by State funds, funds generated by the UCA Performing Arts fees, grants, ticket sales, and donations.

Athletics

The university's athletic teams are known as the Bears for men's teams and Sugar Bears for women's teams. Central Arkansas participates in the NCAA at the Division I (Football Championship Subdivision football) level. On July 1, 2021, UCA left the Southland Conference to join the ASUN Conference, which does not currently sponsor football but has announced plans to launch a football league in the near future. Until that time, UCA is a de facto associate member of the Western Athletic Conference, competing in a football partnership between the two leagues officially branded as the ASUN–WAC Challenge.

UCA fields 17 varsity sports involving over 400 student-athletes. The athletic program includes eight men's sports: baseball, basketball, cross country, football, golf, soccer, and track and field; and nine women's sports: basketball, cross country, golf, soccer, softball, tennis, track & field, volleyball and beach volleyball.

Greek life
UCA Greek life students are members of one of the 29 Greek organizations hosted by the campus. Greek life was established in 1915.

List of Greek Organizations at UCA

North American Interfraternity Conference
North American Interfraternity Conference
 Alpha Sigma Phi
 Beta Upsilon Chi
 Phi Gamma Delta
 Phi Sigma Kappa
 Pi Kappa Alpha
 Sigma Nu
 Sigma Phi Epsilon
 Sigma Tau Gamma

National Panhellenic Conference
National Panhellenic Conference
 Alpha Sigma Alpha
 Alpha Sigma Tau
 Delta Zeta
 Sigma Kappa

National Pan-Hellenic Council
National Pan-Hellenic Council
 Alpha Kappa Alpha
 Alpha Phi Alpha
 Delta Sigma Theta
 Kappa Alpha Psi
 Omega Psi Phi
 Phi Beta Sigma
 Sigma Gamma Rho
 Zeta Phi Beta

Independent Greek Council
 Phi Iota Alpha
 Sigma Iota Alpha
 Sigma Phi Lambda

National Interfraternity Music Council
 Kappa Kappa Psi
 Phi Mu Alpha Sinfonia
 Sigma Alpha Iota
 Tau Beta Sigma

Student Government Association
The Student Government Association, SGA, represents the student body at all times and in all circumstances, in areas such as: allocating and administrating student activity funds; advising the administration in regard to student-related policies; cooperating with faculty in determining student obligations and honors; considering all student petitions to SGA; planning and supervising all SGA elections; and approving charters or cancellations of RSOs.

The SGA was created to represent student interests on campus and push for initiatives that are beneficial for the student body. They are there to make sure that students are the number one priority in every decision made at UCA. The Slogan of SGA is: Students First!

The SGA is composed of total of forty senators divided into: "The Executive Board" consisting of an Executive President, Executive Vice-President, Vice-President of Operations, Vice-President of Finance.
SGA representation from each class shall be as follows: President, Vice-President, five representatives.
Additional Members: five Senators at Large, three Graduate Senators.

University of Central Arkansas Press (1985–1996)
The university established its own academic publishing imprint in 1985 under university president Jefferson D. Farris. It published 23 books by 1996, when university president Winfred L. Thompson closed the press, citing fiscal considerations.

Notable alumni

 Dale Alford, ophthalmologist and politician
 Kris Allen, singer and American Idol winner
 Rick Beck, electrical engineer for Kimberly-Clark in Maumelle and a Republican member of the Arkansas House of Representatives for Conway and Perry counties
 Nate Bowie, professional basketballer and UCA single-game scoring record-holder with 39 points in a single game.
 James Bridges, actor, director, and playwright famous for films such as The China Syndrome and The Paper Chase (film)
 Dee Brown, author of Bury My Heart at Wounded Knee
 Dave Burnette, former NFL player
 Curtis Burrow, former NFL player
 Monte Coleman, former NFL player
 Willie Davis, former NFL player
 James Dickey, basketball college coach
 Jimmy Driftwood, born James Corbitt Morris, songwriter/musician
 Joe Farrer, physical therapist and member of the Arkansas House of Representatives
 Jacob Ford, former NFL player
 Wes Gardner, former MLB player
 Gil Gerard, actor
 William Harrison (1935–2010), obstetrician who performed over 20,000 abortions as the only provider in Northwest Arkansas.
 Bob Johnson, member of the Arkansas House of Representatives for Pulaski County since 2015; former justice of the peace
 Julia Koch, president of David H. Koch Foundation and one of the richest women in the world
 Benjamin Travis Laney, 33rd Governor of Arkansas
 Sheffield Nelson, lawyer and Republican candidate for governor of Arkansas in 1990, obtained degree in mathematics education from Central Arkansas.
 Hiroyuki Nishimura, (attended for one year), founder and former administrator of the most accessed Japanese message board site 2channel; the current owner of the world's largest English language imageboard 4chan.
 Mike Norvell, head football coach Florida State University
 Russ Pennell, basketball college coach
 Scottie Pippen, Basketball Hall of Famer and 6 x NBA Champion
Carol Rasco, MS 1972, Director of the Domestic Policy Council under President Bill Clinton; advocate for disability rights, education, and children
 Marvin Speight, basketball college coach
 Charlie Strong, head football coach University of South Florida
 Shawn Womack, former member of both houses of the Arkansas State Legislature; circuit judge in Arkansas' 14th Judicial District; resident of Mountain Home

References

External links
 
 Central Arkansas Athletics website

 
University of Central Arkansas
Buildings and structures in Conway, Arkansas
Education in Faulkner County, Arkansas
1907 establishments in Arkansas
Educational institutions established in 1907
Little Rock–North Little Rock–Conway metropolitan area